The Most Noble Order of the Garter is a British order of chivalry. It is the world's oldest national order of knighthood in continuous existence and the pinnacle of the British honours system (after the Victoria Cross and George Cross). Its membership is extremely limited, consisting of the Sovereign, the Prince of Wales—both being members ex officio and gaining membership upon acceding to one of the titles—and not more than 24 full members, or Companions. Male members are known as Knights Companion, whilst female members are known as Ladies Companion. The Order can also include certain extra members (members of the British Royal Family and foreign monarchs), known as Supernumerary (or Stranger) Knights and Ladies. The Sovereign alone grants membership to the Order.

Members ex officio

Knights and Ladies Companion

Royal Knights and Ladies (Companion)

Stranger Knights and Ladies Companion (also known as Extra Knights and Ladies Companion)

Officers 
Prelate: Bishop of Winchester (ex officio) – vacant
Chancellor: His Grace The Duke of Abercorn, 
Register: The Right Reverend David Conner, Dean of Windsor (ex officio)
King of Arms: David White, Garter Principal King of Arms (ex officio)
Secretary: Patric Dickinson, 
Usher: Sarah Clarke, Usher of the Black Rod (ex officio)

See also 
List of Knights and Ladies of the Garter (a list of all the members of the Order since its inception)
Banners of the current members of the Garter
Coats of arms of the current members of the Garter

Notes

References

Knights of the Garter
Knights and Ladies of the Garter